SPOP Wave is a Singaporean Chinese singing reality competition featuring eight celebrities competing live in front of the nation and facing the judges consist of various music professionals. It is a spin-off to the 2018's SPOP Sing! due to its similarities. The competition was streamed digitally on meLISTEN, meWatch LIVE and the Entertainment Mediacorp YouTube channel, which premiered on 2 November 2021.

The competition ended on 21 December 2021 with Gao Meigui (mentored by The Freshmen) named as the winner, while Ridhwan Azman (mentored by Hong Junyang) and Sherly Devonne Ng (mentored by The Freshmen) named as runner-up and third place, respectively.

Development
SPOP Wave was first announced on 15 October 2021 on 8world and Mediacorp, revealing that eight celebrities would compete in eight weeks of competition to determine the best celebrity singer with several elements borrowed from other popular singing competitions. YES 933 radio actors Kenneth Chung and Chen Ning were announced as hosts, while Hong Junyang and The Freshmen were revealed as mentors to the celebrity contestants. On 21 October, Kit Chan, Paul and Peter Lee were revealed as resident judges to the competition, and on the 27th, the panel was expanded with four international A-list artists as guest judges, namely Where Chou, Kelly Yu, William Wei and Angela Zhang.

A virtual livestream was held on 26 October through YES 933's social media, meListen and meWATCH live and a preview of the show was unveiled. A second livestream was held on 9 November through meListen and meWATCH as well as televised on Channel 8 and U. The entire competition was shot "live-to-tape" at Capitol Singapore, the site previously used for the semifinal.

Like the flagship competition, a mandatory rule requires all celebrities to sing songs featuring at least one Singaporean in either the lyrics, composition or arrangement.

Sponsorship
None of the sponsors from SPOP Sing! returned to sponsor the show. The new sponsors were Powerhouse Karaoke, Osim International, Simmons, Nature Drops, KKBox and IMC Live Global, which used for the basis of teleconferencing the guest judges at Shanghai as a result of the travel restrictions imposed due to the ongoing COVID-19 pandemic.

Contestants
On 29 October, the eight celebrities were unveiled but they are not explicitly known, and they have been masked as digital avatars and altered microphone keys to conceal their identities. Among the cast announced, six out of eight had previously competed in singing competitions (four of which are from Singapore), five with prior acting roles, a radio DJ, a former getai singer, a YouTube personality and a chef. These eight singers were revealed on two shows on 2 and 9 November, as follows:

Competition summary

Week 1 & 2 - Hidden Identity Singer (2 and 9 November)
The eight celebrities are revealed for the first time in a similar unmasking format in the Masked Singer franchise, with the first week revealing the four celebrities from Team Freshmen while the second week saw the debut of four Team Junyang's celebrities, hence both weeks are non-elimination. A list of songs are determined by an online vote from 15 to 20 October and the songs were announced on 27 October. Kenneth Chung was not present for hosting during the first three weeks of shows.

Week 3 - Quarterfinal 1- Duets (16 November)
In this round, the eight celebrities are each divided into four pairs of duets by their mentors to perform a song, with the order of performance decided by the celebrities with the highest scores from the preliminary round. After both duets, the pair with a higher score are declared safe, while the losing pair are at risk of elimination, as the mentor had to eliminate one celebrity. Kelly Yu served as the guest judge.

Week 4 - Quarterfinal 2- Team Battle (23 November)
In this episode, teams collaborated and performed a medley of three songs in unison (the order are based on the celebrity's role as a lead singer for the respective song from the medley). After both performances, the judges will then vote for the team who performed better. The losing team (either with a minority of votes or in the case of a deadlock, a lower score) will have one team member eliminated by decision from the mentor. Teams participated in a pop quiz (based on the celebrities' profiles, in a series of quizzes) presented by the hosts; teams took turns answer as many questions in 40 seconds, and the team with the most questions correct will decide the performance order. William Wei served as the guest judge.

Week 5 - Quarterfinal 3- Mixed Battle (30 November)
In the third week of the quarterfinals, one celebrity performed a song of their choice and are put through the "hot seat" (represented as a bar stool). For every subsequent performance, the celebrity tries to beat the score from incumbent in the "hot seat"; if the score is higher, the celebrity is safe and is seated on the "comfy seat" (represented as four gaming chairs); otherwise, the incumbent on the "hot seat" is unseated to replace the celebrity on the "hot seat". The celebrity who remained in the "hot seat" (meaning the lowest score) at the end of all the performances is eliminated from the competition. Angela Chang served as the guest judge.

Week 6 - Quarterfinal 4- Mystery Guest Singer PK (7 December)
In the fourth and final Quarterfinals, each celebrity challenged against a mystery guest singer with the identity unknown to the singer prior to the start of each song; the mystery singer's represented as Drogon (billed as "fierce dragon") during introduction, later revealed as Kelvin Tan. The mystery singer sang "心如刀刻" and sets a target score of 86; one-at-a-time, celebrities will attempt to beat the score. All the scores are not revealed until all the celebrities have performed; if at least one celebrity managed to beat Tan's score, the week became non-elimination, and the celebrity with the highest score would earn immunity and immediately advance to the finals, otherwise, the celebrity with the lowest score would face elimination. Where Chou served as the guest judge.

Week 7 - Semifinal- Guest Duets (14 December)
Each celebrity partnered with a guest singer to perform a duet. The scores received for this round will influence the order of performance during the finale. With the previous week's being non-elimination and Gao being immune from elimination (and exempting her from the semifinal), the celebrity with the lowest score for this round will face elimination.

In the finale broadcast, surprise guest singer JJ Lin made an appearance to advise on the finalists.

Week 8 - Finale (21 December)
Each celebrity sang two songs, one uptempo and one ballad, and during the finals, a voting window opens during the live shows until 9.15 pm on meListen's YES 933's page. Both the public vote (for up to three) and the judges scores are given equal say, and the celebrity who received a higher combined score will win SPOP Wave!. William Wei returned as a guest judge while Jim Lim, the musical director, made an appearance in the finale.

Elimination chart
Color key:

Reception
The set with wrinkled curtains, which was seen in the first two episodes, was criticized by viewers after the first episode aired, with comments such as "derogatory" and "unprofessional setting" in the background. The set was modified beginning episode three, with the curtains removed and changing the judging panel's position aligned parallel to the audience's row.

The elimination of Jeremy Chan after episode three had also been criticized, citing either as a technical foul on competition rules, or its format as either confusing or inconsistent, but the production had replied on the controversy as the competition rules had already been explained during the show, and had been followed accordingly.

The naming of Gao Meigui as the champion was also criticised as being rigged, as she was a DJ with YES 933 at the time of the show's airing.

External links
 Official website
 meLISTEN website

References

Singaporean singing competitions
Mediacorp Chinese language programmes
Singaporean reality television series
2021 in Singaporean television
2020s Singaporean television series
Channel 8 (Singapore) original programming
Reality television spin-offs